Social Democratic Party of Russia may refer to one of the following Russian political parties and movements.

 Russian Social Democratic Labour Party (1898-1918)
Russian Social Democratic Labour Party (Mensheviks) (1912-1965)
Russian Social Democratic Labour Party (Bolsheviks) (1917-1918)

 Social Democratic Party of Russia (1990-2011)
 Russian Party of Social Democracy (1994-2002)
 Russian United Social Democratic Party (2000-2001)
 Russian United Democratic Party Yabloko (1993-)
 Social Democratic Party of Russia (2001-2007)
 Union of Social Democrats (2007-с. 2013)
 Russian Social-Democratic Union of Youth (2000-2017, 2021-)
 Social Democratic Party of Russia (2012-2019)